Nanoq Media is a company in Greenland, who produces a television station of the same name, as well as the Nanoq FM radio station. Nanoq Media is also a service provider of broadband internet and digital TV.

The television programming is in the Danish and Greenlandic language. Nanoq Media began broadcasting on 1 August 2002.

Subscription based digital terrestrial television is currently available in the capital Nuuk, Qaqortoq, Ilulissat and Qasigiannguit.

Nanoq Media was originally called Nuuk TV but changed its name to the current name in May 2017 as their services was now available is more cities than just Nuuk.

References

External links
Official site

Radio in Greenland
Television stations in Greenland
Radio stations established in 2002
Mass media companies established in 2002
Television channels and stations established in 2002
2002 establishments in Greenland
Companies based in Nuuk